Prince Demidoff's bushbaby (Galagoides demidovii), also known as Prince Demidoff's galago, is a species of primate in the family Galagidae. It is native to parts of tropical West and Central Africa.

Description
The head is narrow with a pointed muzzle and variable colouring round the eyes. The upper parts are reddish-brown, the underparts are paler and the tail is not bushy.

Distribution and habitat
The species is found in Angola, Benin, Burkina Faso, Burundi, Cameroon, Central African Republic, Republic of the Congo, Democratic Republic of the Congo, Ivory Coast, Equatorial Guinea, Gabon, Ghana, Guinea, Liberia, Mali, Nigeria, Rwanda, Sierra Leone, Tanzania, Togo, Uganda, possibly Kenya, and possibly Malawi. Habitats include both primary and secondary forest as well as swampy forests, mangrove areas, gallery forests and mixed habitats in the Upper Guinean forest zone. It is adaptable and tolerates a certain amount of habitat degradation.

Ecology
Like other galagos, Prince Demidoff's bushbaby is nocturnal and arboreal. At night it forages for insects, mostly beetles and moths, and also feeds on fruit and gum exudate. There is intense competition among males during the breeding season. Females usually have one pregnancy per year, with a gestation period of about 112 days. The female will often hide the baby in the undergrowth during the night while she forages and take it back to the nest in the morning. Weaning takes place at about six weeks and maturity is reached at about nine months.

References

Prince Demidoff's bushbaby
Mammals of Angola
Mammals of Burundi
Mammals of Cameroon
Mammals of the Central African Republic
Mammals of the Republic of the Congo
Mammals of the Democratic Republic of the Congo
Mammals of Equatorial Guinea
Mammals of Gabon
Mammals of Rwanda
Mammals of Tanzania
Mammals of Uganda
Fauna of Central Africa
Mammals of West Africa
Prince Demidoff's bushbaby
Taxonomy articles created by Polbot
Taxobox binomials not recognized by IUCN